Youth of the Nation was an annual Christian Youth Conference held for 15 years in Wanganui, New Zealand. Unlike many other Christian conferences, YOTN was not held by one specific church or denomination. Youth of the Nation conferences and events were hosted by The Youth Of The Nation Trust in collaboration with other churches from around New Zealand. For the first 8 years the conferences were hosted by the Wanganui Christian Youth Workers collective, a group of Christian youth pastors & workers from different denominations & churches across the city of Wanganui. This collective included representatives from Anglican, Apostolic, Assemblies of God, Baptist, Open Brethren, Catholic, Incedo, Presbyterian, Christian Outreach Centre—now known as International Network of Churches—, Elim, Salvation Army, & non-denominational. From 2012 until 2018, the YOTN Trust partnered with churches, not only in Wanganui, but from across New Zealand to host events in different cities.

Introduction 

Youth of the Nation (YOTN) aimed to encourage and empower Christian young people to pursue Jesus Christ with a zeal that will impact their generation. As an event, the goal was to provide a 3-4 day event that was affordable for more New Zealand young people, while maintaining the standards & excellence of some of the leading national conferences.

The vision to hold YOTN came from Wanganui A/G youth pastor, Ben Hoyle. In 2003, Ben approached the local city youth workers to hold the conference as a city. He recognised that for one church to put on such a large event was too much, and that together the city could pull its resources and achieve the goal. With many of the city youth workers on board, plans were made to hold the very first conference in July 2004.

Each year YOTN gained momentum seeing attendance grow and more young people leave excited about their faith.
"YOTN continues to build in its momentum, magnitude and excellence. It is great to see more and more young people coming and leaving radically changed. The greatest thrill for me is seeing the hunger in the younger generation for the reality of God and a deep desire to walk in God's ways. Long may it continue." - Ps Iliafi Esera (Faith City Church A/G, Wanganui)

In 2011, the event moved from the Wanganui Central Baptist Church, where it had been held for 6 years, to the School Hall at Wanganui City College. Then in 2012, YOTN IX was moved to the War Memorial Hall Convention Centre which seats 1500 people, where the conference was held until 2015.

Ben Hoyle resigned as YOTN director in 2018 and Youth of the Nation Trust & events were absorbed into the Fearless Movement of the Assemblies of God NZ under the leadership of Ps Mike Coe from Timaru. YOTN held its final conference in April 2018 at Whanganui Central Baptist Church. The theme for 2018 was 'Possible' and involved reflecting on the past 15 years. Ps Ben Hoyle spoke the final message of conference and Ps Mike Coe closed the conference by announcing the future with Fearless.

History

Conferences
Starting with Youth of the Nation 2004, the conference has been held annually. The first decade of YOTN Conferences were headlined by guest speakers and guest artists.

From 2014, YOTN Conferences no longer headlined regular artists, putting more focus on guest speakers and introducing Tribal War games that had been tested at YOTN X with success.

Speakers
Youth of the Nation Conference has been blessed over the years with some great speakers from across New Zealand, along with many of the gifted ministers from Wanganui itself. Here is a list of all those who have spoken, either in main sessions or electives, over the years:

Youth of the Nation: Preliminary event 

YOTN held a special preliminary event, held in Term One of the school year. It served to bring youth groups and ministries together in cities around the nation. It also gave young people a taste of what the actual conference held later in the year would be like.

Youth of the Nation: Leadership Event 

Following the 10th Anniversary Conference in 2013, YOTN launched a leadership development event held in the later part of the year. "The Aim is to bring youth pastors, leaders and workers together from across Aotearoa to be encouraged, empowered and equipped."

YOTN Championship 

In 2008, the conference added a sports extension. The YOTN Championship is a sports tournament where different churches/youth groups attending the conference entered teams to compete for the YOTN Championship Trophy. It is a fun competitive event.

External links

Websites
Youth of the Nation - official website

News articles
Young folk full on at meet in Wanganui - article in Challenge Weekly Vol 63 Issue No 30 Page 5
 Youth of the Nation Conference 05 - article in Empowered Magazine Spring 2005 Edition Page 13
 Youth of the Nation III Conference - article in Empowered Magazine Spring 2006 Edition Page 14
 Youth of The Nation IV Report - article in Empowered Magazine Spring 2007 Edition Page 10
 Youth of the Nation V - article in Empowered Magazine Spring 2008 Edition Page 7-8
 Youth of the Nation - article in The Wanganui Chronicle Saturday 11 July 2009 Page A4
 Youth of the Nation VII Conference Wanganui - article in Empowered Magazine Spring 2010 Edition Page 31
Don't Sleep Naked - article on Firezone (National Salvation Army Youth Blog) 3 August 2011
 The Message - article in The Wanganui Chronicle Monday 16 July 2012 Page A4
Youth of the Nation Gather - article in The Wanganui Chronicle Thursday 25 July 2013 Front Page
 Youth of the Nation Conference Celebrating 10th Anniversary - article in The River City Press Vol. 29, No 27, July 25, 2013 Page 3
Christian Youth Mark Decade Of Conference - article in The Wanganui Chronicle Saturday 27 July 2013 Page 2
 Youth of the Nation 2016 - article in Empowered Magazine Edition #2 July 2016 Page 18
 Ascend the Hill, Leaders Summit - article in Empowered Magazine Edition #3 December 2016 Page 22
 YOTN God Doesn't Give His Heart in Pieces - article in Empowered Magazine Edition #2 August 2017 Page 20
 Ascend the Hill - article in Empowered Magazine Edition #2 August 2017 Page 21
 15 Years Of Youth of the Nation Conference - article in Empowered Magazine Edition #2 August 2018 Page 18-19

References 

Youth conferences
Christian music festivals
Christian conferences
Christianity in New Zealand